Federico Cornaro (9 June 1531 – 4 October 1590) was a Roman Catholic prelate who served as Cardinal-Priest of Santo Stefano al Monte Celio (1586–1590), Bishop of Padua (1577–1590), Bishop of Bergamo (1561–1577), and Bishop of Trogir (1560–1561).

Biography
Federico Cornaro was born in Venice, Italy and ordained a priest in the Order of Knights of the Hospital of Saint John of Jerusalem. 

On 27 March 1560, he was appointed Bishop of Trogir by Pope Pius IV. On 15 January 1561, he was transferred by Pope Pius IV to the diocese of Bergamo. On 19 July 1577, he was appointed   Bishop of Padua by Pope Gregory XIII. 

On 18 December 1585, he was elevated to the rank of cardinal by Pope Sixtus V and installed on 15 January 1586 as Cardinal-Priest of Santo Stefano al Monte Celio. 

He served as Bishop of Padua until his death on 4 October 1590. While bishop, he was the principal co-consecrator of Bernardo de Benedictis, Bishop of Castellaneta (1585).

See also
Catholic Church in Italy

References

Sources and external links

16th-century Roman Catholic bishops in the Republic of Venice
Bishops appointed by Pope Pius IV
Bishops appointed by Pope Gregory XIII
1531 births
1590 deaths
Bishops of Bergamo
Federico